The 2018 Asian Cycling Championships may refer to:

2018 Asian Road Cycling Championships, a road cycling event held in Myanmar
2018 Asian Track Cycling Championships, a track cycling event held in Malaysia